I Shall Be Released: The Best of James Blundell is the first greatest hits album by Australian recording artist James Blundell, released in August 2001 by EMI; ending his contract with the label. The album has 20 of Blundell's hits and best tracks from the last decade plus 4 brand new tracks "The Valley", "A Moment in Time", "Come Back Soon" and "I Shall Be Released".

Reception
Ron Adsett from Capital News said "If you want a taste of James, this is a great value introduction to the work on his seven other albums to date."

Track listing
 "Moment in Time" (J. Blundell) - 3:36
 "The Old Man's Gone" (J. Blundell) - 3:12
 "Age of Grace" (J. Blundell) -  3:34 
 "Walk On" (G. Barnhill/J. Blundell/V. Melamed) - 3:24	
 "Time On His Hands" (J. Blundell/D. McCumpstie/Garth Porter) - 3:44	
 "Down on the Farm" (J. Blundell/ Billy Dean) - 3:57	
 "Pride" (C. Bailey/J. Blundell) - 4:42	
 "Very Good Song" (J. Blundell/M. King) - 3:54	
 "Mysterious Ways" (J. Blundell/R. Kennedy) - 3:45	
 "Touch of Water" (J. Blundell) - 4:37	
 "Rain on a Tin Roof" (J. Blundell) - 5:04
 "Kimberely Moon" (J. Blundell/D. Trevor) - 3:44	
 "Cloncurry Cattle Song" (J. Blundell/M. Hickson) - 3:24	
 "Come Back Soon" (J. Blundell) - 2:26
 "Guardian Angels" (J. Blundell) - 4:40	
 "The Valley" (J. Blundell) - 3:28	
 "Way Out West"  (with James Reyne)  (The Dingoes) - 4:02	
 "Blue Heeler"	(J. Blundell) - 4:16
 "This Road" (J. Blundell) - 3:47
 "I Shall Be Released" (Bob Dylan) - 4:21

Charts

Release history

References

James Blundell (singer) albums
2001 greatest hits albums
Compilation albums by Australian artists